Last Madame (Chinese: 最后的夫人) is a Singapore Toggle Original created by Jean Yeo, featuring Singaporean Actress Joanne Peh, Taiwanese Actor Jeff Chou, Lina Ng, Brandon Wong, Constance Lau, Fiona Fussi, Ky Tan, and Alan Wan. The English language 12-parter, which weaves a present-day plotline with another set in the 1930s about a brothel owner, is a story of intrigue involving spies, murders, romance and an old shophouse.The series aired on Mediacorp MeWatch Channel in Singapore, it premiered on 26th September 2019 on MeWatch. 

It is the first M18 English Drama produced locally, and the second highest rated locally produced drama.

Synopsis 
Shrouded with secrets and mysteries, a run-down shophouse in Singapore draws attention to banker Chi Ling who returns from Hong Kong to claim its inheritance. As she discovers the drudgeries and intrigues of her great-grandmother’s world – in a brothel set in late 1930s Singapore – she is pushed to decide the fate of the building and to reconcile with her roots and history. The Last Madame is a story that intertwines two seemingly opposite generations through the fascinating story of Chi Ling and her great-grandmother, Fung Lan. 

A story of the past and present – The Last Madame tells the story of the last brothel owner, Fung Lan, in 1930s Singapore. Set in 2019, the successful but cold-hearted Chi Ling returns from Hong Kong to settle an inheritance from her great-grandmother, Fung Lan – only to discover that therein lies deeper and controversial histories behind house.

Casts

Main 

 Joanne Peh as Fung Lan

Ruthless and cold-hearted, Fung Lan is a former prostitute, now the head of a brothel, The House of Phoenix (Fung Wong Gok), in 1930s Singapore. Educated, she fled from her well-to-do family and an arranged marriage as a young girl, only to find herself caught in a deplorable state of affairs that led her to where she is now. She has since remade herself and in light of a grisly murder of the century, changes are abounding her future and the future of the brothel – and we find that there is more to Fung Lan than meets the eye. Fung Lan is a survivor. She wants to take control of her life and beat men at their own game. To her, if you can’t win them, join them and be the boss – and save your kind while you are at it. Seeking revenge, she has achieved it. But now she wants to avoid being caught for her dark past. 

 Jeff Chou as Inspector Mak

Main supporting 
 Lina Ng as Ah Yok
 Brandon Wong (actor) as Lou Seh
 Constance Lau as Siu Lan
 Amanda Ang as Soh Fan
 Fiona Fussi as Chi Ling
 Ky Tan as Guo Wen
 Alan Wan as Harry

Awards and nominations

References

External Links 

 Last Madame: Joanne Peh talks about that steamy M18 scene 
 3 Hot Actors To Look Out For In "Last Madame", Which Won "Best Asian Drama Award" At Busan Event
 Singaporean TV series about a 1940s brothel wins 'Best Asian Drama' in Busan
 Local TV series Last Madame, starring Joanne Peh as brothel owner, wins Best Asian Drama at Korean event
 Local TV series Last Madame, starring Joanne Peh as brothel boss, wins Best Asian Drama at Busan event
 认识《Last Madame》中的养眼型男
 Exclusive look at Last Madame brothel with Joanne Peh | CNA Lifestyle
 Exclusive: Joanne Peh on Last Madame's Best Asian Drama win | ST News Night
 A scandalous tale of a brothel and murder most foul: Last Madame
 Singapore’s Last Madame wins Best Asian Drama award at Asia Contents Awards
 Brandon Wong’s wife still doesn’t know about his hands-on scene with Joanne Peh in Last Madame
 Joanne Peh, Lina Ng Win Acting Prizes For Drama Series Last Madame At Asian Television Awards
 'Last Madame' win best Asian drama
 Fiona Fussi Talks Breaking Boundaries In Last Madame
 Singapore actress Joanne Peh talks about Last Madame’s historic win at Busan International Film Festival event
 Interview: Malaysian actress Amanda Ang wins prestigious New York acting award
 How did Joanne Peh describe her bed scene in ‘Last Madame’ to hubby Qi Yuwu?

English drama
Films shot in Singapore